The Carrizozo Woman's Club, at 908 Eleventh St., Carrizozo, New Mexico is a woman's club.  Its building was constructed in 1939 and was listed on the National Register of Historic Places in 2003.

It is Pueblo Revival in style.  The building is L-shaped, about  along the front and about  along the side.  It has a  Round Room.

It operates under the auspices of the New Mexico Federation of Women's Clubs (NMFWC). (now known as GFWC New Mexico).

The building was a Works Progress Administration project.

The building was identified in 2002 as one of the Ten Most Endangered Properties in New Mexico, by the New Mexico Cultural Preservation Alliance.  It had a notably severe crack in one of its adobe walls.  The situation "attracted the attention of preservations and prompted club members to begin researching the property and preparing a nomination to list it in the State Register of Cultural Properties. Interest raised by NMFWC in other communities about other club buildings led the New Mexico Historic Preservation Division (NMHPD) to contract with historian David Kammer to identify and evaluate" other clubhouses as well, including the Alamogordo Woman's Club and the Silver City Woman's Club.

References

External links

Women's club buildings
National Register of Historic Places in Lincoln County, New Mexico
Pueblo Revival architecture in New Mexico
Buildings and structures completed in 1939
Women's clubs in the United States
Women's organizations based in the United States
Clubhouses on the National Register of Historic Places in New Mexico
History of women in New Mexico